Margarita Musto (born 16 November 1955) is a Uruguayan actress, theater director, translator, teacher, and general and artistic director of the .

Biography
She has worked under directors such as Carlos Aguilera, Jorge Curi, Mario Morgan, Omar Varela, China Zorrilla, David Hammond, and Valentin Tepliakov. She participated in works by classic authors such as Chekhov, Shakespeare, and Federico García Lorca.

She worked on the television series Los Tres. For this role she received awards at the Guadalajara International Film Festival and the 12th Cinematographic Festival of Uruguay.

As a theater actress, one of Musto's most relevant works was Breaking the Code by Hugh Whitemore, about the life of Alan Turing. Directed by Héctor Manuel Vidal, the play ran for four years and more than 300 showings, as of 1994.

Her play En honor al mérito, based on the investigation of the murder of Zelmar Michelini, and in which she also acted, was released in 2000 at  theater. In 2011 she again received the Florencio for best direction and the best theatrical show of the season for Blackbird by Scottish dramatist David Harrower. Another of her successes as a director was Top Girls by the English playwright Caryl Churchill.

Muasto has translated plays from French and English into Spanish. From 2 January 2013 to 2016, she served as director general and artistic director of the Comedia Nacional, being the first woman to hold that position.

In 2004 the Uruguayan branch of B'nai B'rith presented her with the Fraternity Award for her theatrical career.

She was the wife of theater director Héctor Manuel Vidal, who died in 2014. Her daughter María Vidal Musto is a theater actress.

Filmography
  (1993)
  (1997)
  (2000)
  (2002)
  (2008)
  (short, 2011)
 Breadcrumbs (2016)

References

External links
 

1955 births
20th-century dramatists and playwrights
20th-century Uruguayan educators
20th-century translators
20th-century Uruguayan actresses
21st-century dramatists and playwrights
21st-century Uruguayan educators
21st-century translators
21st-century Uruguayan actresses
Actresses from Montevideo
Drama teachers
English–Spanish translators
French–Spanish translators
Living people
Uruguayan women dramatists and playwrights
Uruguayan educators
Uruguayan film actresses
Uruguayan stage actresses
Uruguayan television actresses
Uruguayan theatre directors
Uruguayan translators
Uruguayan women educators
Women theatre directors
21st-century Uruguayan women writers
20th-century Uruguayan women writers
Fraternity Award